Jean Dasté, born Jean Georges Gustave Dasté, (18 September 1904 in Paris, France – 15 October 1994 in Saint-Priest-en-Jarez, Loire, France) was an actor and theatre director.

Although Jean Dasté is best known for his career on stage as both an actor and director in a variety of works including those by Shakespeare and Molière, he made his first appearance on screen in a 1932 Jean Renoir film (Boudu sauvé des eaux), and 57 years later appeared in his final film at the age of 85. He played also the main character in two Jean Vigo movies, L'Atalante and Zéro de conduite. Later, he worked also with Alain Resnais and François Truffaut.

He married Danish-born actress Marie-Hélène Copeau (1902–1994), the daughter of the influential French writer, editor, and drama critic Jacques Copeau (1879–1949) and Agnès Thomsen.

In 1947, he became the founding director of the Comedie de St.-Etienne stage company in the town of Saint-Étienne in the Loire département. The success of his theater was such that there is a college and a theater in Saint-Étienne named in his honor.

Filmography as actor

 Boudu sauvé des eaux (Boudu Saved from Drowning) (1932) - The student
 Zéro de conduite (Zero for Conduct) (1933) - Surveillant Huguet
 L'Atalante (1934) - Jean
 Le Crime de monsieur Lange (The Crime of Monsieur Lange) (1936) - The Model maker
 Sous les yeux d'occident (Under Western Eyes) (1936) - Georges
 La vie est à nous (1936) - L'instituteur/Teacher
 La Grande Illusion (Grand Illusion) (1937) - The teacher
 Le Temps des cerises (The Time of the Cherries) (1938) - Le fils du directeur / The director's son
 Remorques (1941) - Le radio
 Croisières sidérales (1942) - Pépin
 Picpus (1943) - Le clerc
 Une étoile au soleil (1943)
 Adieu Léonard (1943) - Le raccommodeur de porcelaine
 La Grande Meute (1945) - L'huissier
 Le Mystère Saint-Val (1945) - L'huissier
 Muriel ou Le temps d'un retour (1963) - L'homme à la chèvre / The Goat Man
 Heaven on One's Head (Le Ciel sur la tête) (1965) - M. Bazin
 La guerre est finie (The War Is Over) (1966) - Le chef du réseau clandestin / Chief
 Z (1969) - Illya Coste
 L'Enfant sauvage (The Wild Child) (1970) - Professor Philippe Pinel
 Beau Masque (1972) - Cuvrot
 Les Jours gris (1974) - Le vieil homme
 Le Petit Marcel (1976) - Berger
 Le Corps de mon ennemi (1976) - Le gardien du chantier / Keeper
 L'Homme qui aimait les femmes (The Man Who Loved Women) (1977) - Docteur Bicard
 La Chambre verte (The Green Room) (1978) - Bernard Humbert
 Utopia (1978) - Jean
 Molière (1978) - The grandfather
 La Tortue sur le dos (1978) - Bad-tempered invalid
 Rue du Pied de Grue (1979) - Tonton
 Mon oncle d'Amérique (My American Uncle) (1980) - M. Louis
 Une semaine de vacances (1980) - Le père de Laurence
 Le Crime d'amour (1982) - L'homme de l'asile
 Les Îles (1983) - Jean
 L'Amour à mort (1984) - Dr. Rozier
 Le Moine et la Sorcière (1987) - Christophe
 Nuit docile (1987) - Le chauffeur de taxi
 Noce blanche (1989) - Le concierge
 Projections (1990) - Le propriétaire de la salle de cinéma (final film role)

References

External links
 

Adapted from the article Jean Dasté, from Wikinfo, licensed under the GNU Free Documentation License.

Additional resources
Dasté, Jean. Voyage d'un comédien. Paris: Stock, 1977. 
Mignon, Paul-Louis. Jean Dasté. Paris: Les Presses Littéraires de France, 1953.
Rousset, Hughues, editor. Jean Dasté: un homme de théâtre dans le siècle. L'Etrat: Actes graphiques, 2015.  

French male stage actors
1904 births
1994 deaths
French theatre directors
Male actors from Paris
French male film actors
20th-century French male actors